Anna Tsygankova (born 1979) is a Russian ballet dancer. After terms with the Bolshoi and the Hungarian National Ballet, she joined the Dutch National Ballet in 2008 where she is a principal dancer.

Early life
Born in Novosibirsk, Siberia, she received her training at the Novosibirsk Ballet Academy and the Académie de Danse Classique Princesse Grace in Monte Carlo.

Career
While she was with the  Bolshoi Ballet in Moscow, she was coached by Raisa Struchkova. In 2004, she joined the Hungarian National Ballet in Budapest before moving to Amsterdam in 2007 to join the Dutch National Ballet as a principal dancer.

Tsygankova's repertoire include Giselle, Nikita in La Bayadère, Odette/Odile in Swan Lake, Aurora in The Sleeping Beauty and repertory by George Balanchine, Rudi van Dantzig, Wayne Eagling, William Forsythe, Kenneth MacMillan and Hans van Manen. Her role creations include Kitri in Alexei Ratmansky's Don Quixote and Christopher Wheeldon’s Cinderella.

She had made guest appearances with the Hong Kong Ballet and The Royal Ballet in 2014 and 2015 respectively, dancing Kitri in Don Quixote with both companies.

Reviewing her performance of Cinderella, The Guardian noted that emotionally, "she carries the piece."

In 2017, Tsygankova took time off from dancing to prepare for her child's birth. She returned to the Dutch National Ballet in October 2018 with La Dame aux Camélias.

Tsygankova's performances in Cinderella, Giselle, Mata Hari, The Nutcracker, and Don Quixote have been filmed in recent years.

Awards
1995, Prix de Lausanne (Switzerland), silver
1996, International Balletconcours, bronze
2008, Alexandria Radius Award
2012, Nomination Benois de la Danse
2014 Grand Prix, Dance Open Festival, St Petersburg
2016 Mrs. Expressivity award, Dance Open Festival, St. Petersburg
2017 Dancer of the Year – Critic's Choice
2017 Merit Award – Dansersfonds '79

References

Russian ballerinas
Dutch National Ballet principal dancers
Prima ballerinas
1979 births
Living people
People from Novosibirsk
Russian expatriates in Hungary
Russian expatriates in the Netherlands
21st-century Russian ballet dancers